Seeniyapuram (also known as Rajakuthalaperi) is a village within Veeravanallur, in the Tirunelveli district of India. The population of the village is approximately 1000.Is this area is more dangerous area in tirunelveli. 

Villages in Tirunelveli district